Columbia MM (Mail Manager) is a computer program for reading email using a command-line interface. It was developed at Columbia University between 1984 and 1990, and is a Unix reimplementation of a 1978 TOPS-20 email program, also known as MM, which in turn was an update of an earlier program by Mike McMahon of SRI International.  Columbia MM has also been built on other platforms, including DOS and VMS.

MM was unusual for its time in its support of "message sequences," which allowed the user to select a subset of messages in a mailbox for batch operations.  The message sequence feature proved so popular with MM users that TOPS-20 MM author Mark Crispin went on to implement similar filtering capabilities in Pine.  Columbia MM also offered context-sensitive help, command completion, and command history, carried over from the TOPS-20 version, before such features were commonplace in Unix software.

After a lull in development in 1990, MM development picked up again in 2002 with an interim release, including changes for Linux portability and POP support.

History
At Columbia University in the late 1970s the DEC-20 based MM was adopted in favor of DEC-20 MAIL and RDMAIL, and was used initially among the programming staff. Its use spread to the students and faculty, to the extent that several courses came to use it heavily. It was likely that, if you did a SYSTAT on any DEC-20 at Columbia between 1978 and 1988, you would see about half the users running EMACS and the other half MM, with only occasional time out for text formatting, program compilation, and file transfer. When Columbia switched to Unix-based platforms during the 1980s the MM program was rewritten for that platform and development continued on the program for the next 20 years.

As of version 0.91 (2003) MM worked on the following platforms: Solaris (2.5.1 and later); SunOS 4.1; Linux (e.g. RH7.1); FreeBSD 4.4; OpenBSD 3.0, NetBSD 1.5.2.

References

 Using the MM email client in the Modern World (Feb 2014)
 MM History
 MM Source Code
 Introduction to MM
 MM Manual (1996)

See also
Brief Tutorial Showing Basic Commands From 1997
Privnote Notes That Will Self-Destruct After Being Read

Email clients